Le Grand-Serre is a commune in the Drôme department in southeastern France.

Geography
The Galaure flows west through the northern part of the commune, then forms part of its north-western border.

The nearest communes are Marcollin and Saint Clair sur Galaure.

Population

Education 
2 schools are located in the commune, a primary school and a high school.

Events 
 Each year during summer is organized a party in the village called "La Vogue". Every village in Drôme does his own party that lasts 2 or 3 days.

See also
Communes of the Drôme department

References

Communes of Drôme